Jack Crawford may refer to:

Sports
 Jack Crawford (cricketer) (1886–1963), Surrey and South Australia all-rounder
 Jackie Crawford (1896–1975), English footballer during the 1920s and 1930s
 Jack Crawford (tennis) (1908–1991), Australian tennis player of the 1930s
 Jack Crawford (ice hockey) (1916–1973), Canadian ice hockey defenceman and coach
 Jack Crawford (American football) (born 1988), American football player
 Jack Crawford (alpine skier) (born 1997), Canadian skier

Other
 Jack Crawford (sailor) (1775–1831), sailor of the Royal Navy known as the Hero of Camperdown
 John Wallace Crawford (1847–1917), a.k.a. "Captain Jack", American Civil War veteran, Old West scout and poet
 Jack Randall Crawford (1878–1968), author and professor of English at Yale University
 Jack Crawford (politician) (1916–1982), Australian politician
 Jack Crawford (character), fictional FBI agent in Thomas Harris's Hannibal Lecter novels and films

See also
 Jak Crawford, American racing driver
John Crawford (disambiguation)